George Chambers (1766 – after 1826), of Hartford, near Huntingdon, Cambridgeshire, was an English soldier, lawyer and Member of Parliament.

Family
Chambers was the son of Sir William Chambers of Whitton Place, Middlesex and his wife Anne née Moore, of Bromsgrove, Worcestershire. He was educated at Lincoln's Inn. In 1784, without their families' permission, he married Jane Rodney, probably an illegitimate daughter of George Brydges Rodney, 1st Baron Rodney. They had one daughter and eight sons.

Career
He was a Member (MP) of the Parliament of England for Honiton 1796–1802.

References

1766 births
19th-century deaths
18th-century English people
Members of the Parliament of Great Britain for Honiton
Members of the Parliament of the United Kingdom for Honiton
British MPs 1796–1800
UK MPs 1801–1802
40th Regiment of Foot officers
British Life Guards officers